Manga Khan, originally known as Lord Manga, is a DC Comics supervillain and an intergalactic trader. A gaseous being, he relies on a metallic suit to give him form. He had a robot companion named L-Ron (before trading him to the Justice League), and was a foe of the Justice League in the early 1990s.

Fictional character biography
In one of his first encounters with the Justice League, Manga kidnaps Mister Miracle in order to open up trade relations with Apokolips. He is followed in a spaceship by Big Barda, G'Nort, Rocket Red and Martian Manhunter. Teamwork allows them to find Manga, which enrages him to the point of damaging his L-Ron. His robotic assistant is not too concerned, he then ponders what the 'fall line' of robotic forms look like.

Less of a villain
After this situation, Manga Khan becomes a more helpful person, befriending the Justice League. He takes Despero off their hands after the Martian Manhunter devolves him. This trade ends with L-Ron being in the employ of the League, which would last for some time.

In Justice League Europe #28, Manga takes the defeated villain Starro. Despero however escapes, but Khan hires Lobo to retrieve him. Lobo comes to believe that Khan's way of speaking has started to affect him: Khan suffers from a condition which causes him to soliloquy at random intervals, in a parody of comics from the sixties. In the same vein, he founds the Manga Khan School of Melodrama to teach similar speech patterns to other characters. One of his alumni is the Scarlet Skier.

Khan later works with Mister Miracle as part of a scheme to market soap all across the galaxy. At first it gets the two into trouble with the dolphin loving Lobo. Khan suffers damage to his robotic shell but later recovers. Later, they attempt to market the soap to the filthy denizens of Apokolips. Not only does this product clean anything material, it cleans souls as well. The revolution they cause is stopped by Darkseid.

Powers and abilities
In his natural gaseous state Manga Khan can communicate telepathically but can't physically interact with anything. He normally wears an armored suit that makes him impervious to damage and grants him superhuman strength. Manga is a poor fighter preferring to talk his way out of combat. Manga is a master negotiator and barterer, thoroughly lacking ethics in his wheeling and dealings.

Relationships
Many of Manga Khan's male (or "male"-personality) robotic assistants are named after science fiction writers: L-Ron after L. Ron Hubbard, Hein-9 after Robert A. Heinlein, K-Dikk after Philip K. Dick, for instance. In the 2003 miniseries Formerly Known as the Justice League, a "female" robotic assistant, J-Lo, was introduced, whose moniker is, of course, derived from a popular nickname for Jennifer Lopez. This same series saw Manga Khan speaking of strong feelings for L-Ron, which he referred to as "the love which can never speak its name". A portion of the storyline is dedicated to his attempts to recover the robot, who remains in the company of several of Earth's superheroes. The same storyline implied that J-Lo was interested in a relationship with Manga Khan, which the alien trader seemed to reciprocate. Although none of the robots are built to appear especially masculine or feminine, their personalities are described as such, and they are referred to by other speakers in the comics with appropriate pronouns.

References

 

DC Comics aliens
DC Comics extraterrestrial supervillains
DC Comics LGBT supervillains
DC Comics male supervillains
DC Comics supervillains